CombatGuard is a new generation of 4x4 armoured combat vehicle designed and manufactured by IMI (Israel Military Industries), unveiled in 2014.

It features a monocoque central crew capsule of all-welded steel with an appliqué armour package, claimed to provide a high level of protection against small arms fire, mines, improvised explosive devices (IEDs) and explosive formed projectiles. It has an Iron Fist Bright Arrow active protection system against projectiles and missiles.

It can ford water obstacles 1.5 meter deep, travel a 35% side slopes and climb over a 70% gradient, vertical obstacles up to 80 cm in forward drive and in reverse. Capable of 90 degree approach and departure angles.

Operators
: In use by the President of Turkmenistan.

See also
 RAM MK3
 Wildcat APC
 Golan Armored Vehicle
 Panhard CRAB

References

External links

Armoured fighting vehicles of Israel
Armoured personnel carriers of Israel
Armoured fighting vehicles of the post–Cold War period
Armoured cars of Israel
All-wheel-drive vehicles
Military trucks
Off-road vehicles
Military vehicles introduced in the 2010s